Branislav Niňaj (born 17 May 1994) is a Slovak professional footballer who plays as a defender for Romanian club Sepsi Sfântu Gheorghe.

Early career
In summer 2012, he moved from Petržalka 1898 to the fellow Bratislava team Slovan Bratislava. He made his Corgoň Liga debut for Slovan 2013 against ViOn Zlaté Moravce on 1 March 2013, Slovan won this match 4–1.

International career
Niňaj made an unexpected international debut under Ján Kozák on 19 November 2013 in a memorable first UEFA-recognised match against Gibraltar (0–0), when he tactically replaced Jakub Sylvestr in the 85th minute. However, he failed to make another appearance under Kozák until his resignation in October 2018.

After Niňaj joined Fortuna Sittard, where he experienced an incomparably more successful season to the previous ones, he was again nominated to the national team, initially as an alternate. Niňaj's first nomination to the national team nomination after over 5 years happened on 28 May 2019 when coach Pavel Hapal called him up for a double fixture in June - a home friendly against Jordan, to which, unusually, 29 players were called-up and a UEFA Euro 2020 qualifying fixture against Azerbaijan, played away on 11 June 2019. The squad was to be reduced to 23 players for the latter fixture.

International stats

Honours
Slovan Bratislava
 Slovak Super Liga: 2012–13, 2013–14
 Slovak Cup: 2012–13
 Slovak Super Cup: 2014

Sepsi OSK 
Cupa României: 2021–22
Supercupa României: 2022

External links

References

Living people
1994 births
Footballers from Bratislava
Slovak footballers
Slovakia international footballers
Slovakia youth international footballers
Slovakia under-21 international footballers
Association football defenders
FC Petržalka players
ŠK Slovan Bratislava players
K.S.C. Lokeren Oost-Vlaanderen players
Ankaraspor footballers
MŠK Žilina players
Fortuna Sittard players
Sepsi OSK Sfântu Gheorghe players
2. Liga (Slovakia) players
Slovak Super Liga players
Belgian Pro League players
Süper Lig players
Eredivisie players
Liga I players
Expatriate footballers in Belgium
Slovak expatriate sportspeople in Belgium
Expatriate footballers in Turkey
Slovak expatriate sportspeople in Turkey
Expatriate footballers in the Netherlands
Slovak expatriate sportspeople in the Netherlands
Expatriate footballers in Romania
Slovak expatriate sportspeople in Romania